A Hard Road is the third album (and second studio album) recorded by John Mayall & the Bluesbreakers, released in 1967. It features Peter Green on lead guitar, John McVie on bass, Aynsley Dunbar on drums and John Almond on saxophone.  Tracks 5, 7 and 13 feature the horn section of Alan Skidmore and Ray Warleigh.  Peter Green sings lead vocals on "You Don't Love Me" and "The Same Way".

The album reached #8 on the UK album charts which is Mayall's third biggest chart next to Bare Wires and Bluesbreakers with Eric Clapton which reached #3 and #6, respectively.

The cover art and the original LP sleeve design are by Mayall. In 2003 and 2006 two different expanded versions of the album were released.

Reception
Reaction to the album was mostly positive, and many praised Green's guitar playing. Team Rock rated the album at 14, on their "Top 30 British Blues Rock Albums of All Time". The two re-issues of the album, in 2003 (double CD) and 2006 (single CD), have compiled all of the Peter Green studio contributions he made to John Mayall's Bluesbreakers over 1966–1971. The bonus tracks missing from the 2006 remaster (except "Evil Woman Blues") appeared on the remastered versions of the next Bluesbreakers studio albums, "Crusade" and "Bare Wires".

It was voted number 638 in the third edition of Colin Larkin's All Time Top 1000 Albums (2000).

Track listing
All tracks by John Mayall except where noted.

Original album
Side one
 "A Hard Road"  – 3:12
 "It's Over"  – 2:51
 "You Don't Love Me" (Willie Cobbs)  – 2:50
 "The Stumble" (Freddie King, Sonny Thompson)  – 2:54
 "Another Kinda Love"  – 3:06
 "Hit the Highway"  – 2:17
 "Leaping Christine"  – 2:25

Side two
 "Dust My Blues" (Elmore James, Joe Josea)  – 2:50
 "There's Always Work"  – 1:38
 "The Same Way" (Peter Green)  – 2:11
 "The Supernatural" (Green)  – 2:57
 "Top of the Hill"  – 2:40
 "Someday After a While (You'll Be Sorry)" (King, Thompson)  – 3:02
 "Living Alone"  – 2:23

2003 expanded version (2CD/36 tracks)

Disc one
1–14 Original album tracks (as above)

 "Evil Woman Blues" (Green)  – 4:05
 "All My Life" (Robinson)  – 4:25
 "Ridin' on the L&N" (Burley, Hampton)  – 2:32
 "Little by Little" (London, Wells)  – 2:47
 "Eagle Eye"  – 2:52

Disc two
 "Looking Back" (Watson)  – 2:37
 "So Many Roads" 	(Paul)  – 4:47
 "Sitting in the Rain"  – 2:59
 "Out of Reach" (Green)  – 4:44
 "Mama, Talk to Your Daughter" (Atkins, Lenoir)  – 2:39
 "Alabama Blues" (Lenoir)  – 2:31
 "Curly" (Green)  – 4:51
 "Rubber Duck" (Dunbar, Green)  – 4:00
 "Greeny" (Green)  – 3:56
 "Missing You" (Green)  – 1:59
 "Please Don't Tell"  – 2:29
 "Your Funeral and My Trial" (Williamson)  – 3:56
 "Double Trouble" (Rush)  – 3:22
 "It Hurts Me Too" (London)  – 2:57
 "Jenny"  – 4:38
 "Picture on the Wall"  – 3:03	
 "First Time Alone"  – 5:00

The additional material is:

Disc 1 – 15 from Raw Blues; 16–19 from the EP with Paul Butterfield

Disc 2 – 1–3 and 13–16 from Looking Back; 4–7 and 9–12 from Thru the Years; 8 from the B-side of "Curly" single; 17 from Blues from Laurel Canyon

2006 UK expanded version (1CD/28 tracks, 4 unreleased)

1–14 Original album tracks (as above)

 "Looking Back" (Watson)  – 2:37
 "So Many Roads" (Paul)  – 4:47
 "Mama, Talk to Your Daughter" (Atkins, Lenoir)  – 2:39
 "Alabama Blues" (Lenoir)  – 2:31
 "All My Life"  – 4:25
 "Ridin' on the L & N" (Burley, Hampton)  – 2:32
 "Eagle Eye"  – 2:52
 "Little By Little"  – 2:47 
 "Sitting in the Rain"  – 2:59
 "Out of Reach" (Green)  – 4:44
 "No More Tears"  – 2:19
 "Ridin' on the L & N" (Burley, Hampton)  – 2:19
 "Sitting in the Rain"  – 2:53
 "Leaping Christine"  – 1:55

The previously unreleased tracks 15–16, 23 from Looking Back; 17–18, 24 from Thru the Years; 19–22 are from the EP with Paul Butterfield; 25–28 are from BBC sessions

Personnel
Original album
John Mayall & the Bluesbreakers
John Mayall – vocals, guitar, harmonica, piano, organ
Peter Green – guitar, vocals
John McVie – bass
Hughie Flint, Aynsley Dunbar – drums
with:
John Almond, Alan Skidmore – saxophones
Ray Warleigh – wind instruments

2003 expanded edition
Same as above with the addition of:
Colin Allen – drums
Paul Butterfield – harmonica, vocals
Mick Fleetwood – drums
Henry Lowther – trumpet
Nick Newell – saxophone

Production
Produced by Mike Vernon
Recording Engineer: Gus Dudgeon

References

John Mayall & the Bluesbreakers albums
1967 albums
Albums produced by Mike Vernon (record producer)
Decca Records albums
London Records albums